is a passenger railway station in the city of Isumi, Chiba Prefecture, Japan, operated by the third-sector railway operator Isumi Railway.

Lines
Nishi-Ōhara Station is served by the Isumi Line, and lies 1.7 kilometers from the eastern terminus of the line at Ōhara.

Station layout
The station consists of a simple side platform serving a bidirectional single-track line, with a three-sided rain shelter built onto the platform. The station is unattended.

Platforms

Adjacent stations

History
Nishi-Ōhara Station opened on June 20, 1960, as a station on the Japanese National Railways (JNR) Kihara Line. With the division and privatization of JNR on April 1, 1987, the station came under control of East Japan Railway Company (JR East). On March 24, 1988, operation of the Kihara Line was transferred to the third-sector railway operator Isumi Railway, with the line renamed the Isumi Line.

Passenger statistics
In fiscal 2018, the station was used by an average of 13 passengers daily.

Surrounding area
Isumi Municipal Tōkai Elementary School

See also
 List of railway stations in Japan

References

External links

  

Railway stations in Japan opened in 1960
Railway stations in Chiba Prefecture
Isumi Line
Isumi